Russian grammar employs an Indo-European inflexional structure, with considerable adaptation.

Russian has a highly inflectional morphology, particularly in nominals (nouns, pronouns, adjectives and numerals). Russian literary syntax is a combination of a Church Slavonic heritage, a variety of loaned and adopted constructs, and a standardized vernacular foundation.

The spoken language has been influenced by the literary one, with some additional characteristic forms. Russian dialects show various non-standard grammatical features, some of which are archaisms or descendants of old forms discarded by the literary language.

Various terms are used to describe Russian grammar with the meaning they have in standard Russian discussions of historical grammar, as opposed to the meaning they have in descriptions of the English language; in particular, aorist, imperfect, etc., are considered verbal tenses, rather than aspects, because ancient examples of them are attested for both perfective and imperfective verbs. Russian also places the accusative case between the dative and the instrumental, and in the tables below, the accusative case appears between the nominative and genitive cases.

Nouns 

Nominal declension involves six main casesnominative, genitive, dative, accusative, instrumental, and prepositionalin two numbers (singular and plural), and absolutely obeying grammatical gender (masculine, feminine, and neuter). Up to ten additional cases are identified in linguistics textbooks, although all of them are either incomplete (do not apply to all nouns) or degenerate (appear identical to one of the six main cases) – the most recognized additional cases are locative, partitive and vocative. Old Russian also had a third number, the dual, but it has been lost except for its use in the nominative and accusative cases with the numbers two, three, and four (e.g. , "two chairs"), where it is now reanalyzed as genitive singular.

More often than in many other Indo-European languages, Russian noun cases may supplant the use of prepositions entirely. Furthermore, every preposition is exclusively used with a particular case (or cases). Their usage can be summarised as:
 nominative:
 main subject;
 default case to use outside sentences (dictionary entries, signs, etc.);
 prepositions:  '(what) kind of?'; : 'join the ranks of' (with plural noun only);
 accusative:
 direct object;
 some time expressions;
 prepositions indicating motion:  'into, in(ward)',  'onto (the top of)',  'behind, after',  'under';
 other prepositions:  'about',  'over, through',  'through';
 genitive:
 possession – 'of' (genitive noun);
 numerals and quantifiers;
 negated verbs (which take direct objects in Accusative) to indicate total absence;
 some time expressions;
 prepositions:  'without',  'instead of',  'near',  'around',  'ahead of',  'for',  'before',  'from',  'because of, from behind',  'from',  'except for',  'past by',  'near',  'after',  'against, opposite',  'among',  'by',  'near',  'along',  'out of, outside',  'inside';
 verbs:  'afraid of',  'reach',  'avoid';
 adjectives:  'full of' (genitive noun);
 dative:
 indirect object – 'to' (dative noun);
 some time expressions;
 impersonal clauses:  – 'I am cold', lit. "to_me (is) cold";
 age statements:  – 'I am 20 (years old)', lit. 'to_me (is) 20 years';
 prepositions:  'on',  'to(wards)',  'thanks to';
 auxiliaries:  or  'need/must (to)',  'allowed',  'forbidden';
 verbs:  'believe',  'help',  'advise',  'call',  'amaze (self)';
 instrumental:
 instrument used in the action or means by which action is carried out – 'by' (I. noun);
 logical subject of passive clause:  – 'the letter was written by Ivan';
 secondary direct object:  – 'he is considered (to be) a student';
 durational time expressions;
 verbs:  'interest (to be interested in)',  'use',  'occupy (to be preoccupied with)';
 associates of connective verbs:  'be',  'became',  'remain',  'appear to be',  'turn out to be';
 prepositions of position:  'behind',  'in front of',  'above',  'below',  'between',  '(together) with';
 adjective:  'pleased by';
 prepositional:
 prepositions of place:  'inside',  'on (top of)';
 other prepositions:  'about',  'by/of/with';
Definite and indefinite articles (corresponding to 'the', 'a', 'an' in English) do not exist in the Russian language. The sense conveyed by such articles can be determined in Russian by context. However, Russian also utilizes other means of expressing whether a noun is definite or indefinite:
 The same goes for certain verbs expressing a desire to achieve something: wait, wish, ask, want, etc. When the inanimate object is definite (certain, or at least expected), the accusative is used; when it is indefinite (uncertain), the genitive is used.
 The use of the numeral one sometimes signifies that the noun is indefinite, e.g.:  –  ("Why did it take you so long?" – "Well, I met one [=a] friend and had to talk").
 The plural form may signify indefiniteness:  ("You can buy this in shops") vs.  ("You can buy this in the shop").

The category of animacy is relevant in Russian nominal and adjectival declension. Specifically, the accusative has two possible forms in many paradigms, depending on the animacy of the referent. For animate referents (persons and animals), the accusative form is generally identical to the genitive form. For inanimate referents, the accusative form is identical to the nominative form. This principle is relevant for masculine singular nouns of the second declension (see below) and adjectives, and for all plural paradigms (with no gender distinction). In the tables below, this behavior is indicated by the abbreviation 'N or G' in the row corresponding to the accusative case.

Russian uses three declensions:
 The second declension is used for most masculine and neuter nouns.

"time") and one masculine noun  "way". However, these nouns and their forms have sufficient similarity with feminine third declension nouns that scholars such as Litnevskaya consider them to be non-feminine forms of this declension.

However, if words  and  represent a compound preposition meaning"while, during the time of"they are written with :  "in a time of an hour".

First declension

Feminine and masculine nouns ending with 'а' or  vowel

Second declension

Masculine nouns ending with a consonant sound 

Some singular nouns denoting groups of people may include  suffix before ending.

Neuter nouns

Third declension

Feminine nouns ending with letter ь

Neuter nouns ending with мя

Indeclinable nouns 
Some nouns (such as borrowings from other languages, abbreviations, etc.) are not modified when they change number and case. This occurs especially when the ending appears not to match any declension pattern in the appropriate gender. An example of an indeclinable noun is кофе ("coffee").

Additional cases 
Some nouns use several additional cases. The most important of these are:
 Locative: the most common minor case, used after prepositions of location. With most nouns the prepositional form is used in such instances. When there is a distinct locative, it may match the dative, or may take a unique form.
 Partitive, or second genitive: sometimes used instead of the genitive:  (to pour tea) – not .
 Vocative: used in archaic expressions to call or identify a person:  (My God!). The modern vocative (sometimes called neo-vocative) is used to produce a person's nickname by removing the vowel ending from the affectionate version of the name:  —  (short, affectionate) —  (neo-vocative); . The neo-vocative has no plural form and can only be applied to names frequently used in Russian; rare names (chiefly non-Slavic) do not have affectionate versions and thus no means of forming the neo-vocative.
 Caritive, used with the negation of verbs:  (not know the truth) –  (know the truth). This case is sometimes identical to the genitive and sometimes to the accusative.

Adjectives 
A Russian adjective is usually placed before the noun it qualifies, and it agrees with the noun in case, gender, and number. Formerly (as in the bylinas) short adjectives appeared in all other forms and roles, which are not used in the modern language, but are nonetheless understandable to Russian speakers as they are declined exactly like nouns of the corresponding gender.

Adjectives may be divided into three general groups:
 qualitative – denote a quality of the object; this is the only group that usually has degrees of comparison.
 relational – denote some sort of relationship; unlikely to act as a predicate or have a short form.
 possessive – denote belonging to a specific subject; have some declensional peculiarities.

Adjectival declension 
The pattern described below holds true for full forms of most adjectives, except possessive ones. Russian differentiates between hard-stem and soft-stem adjectives, shown before and after a slash sign.

 The masculine and neuter genitive singular adjectival endings -ого and -его are pronounced as -ово and -ево.
 After a sibilant (ш, ж, ч, щ) or velar (к, г, х) consonant, и is written instead of ы.
 When a masculine adjective ends in -ой in the nominative, the stress falls on the final syllable throughout its declension:  ("straight"), compare  ("stubborn").
 The "хоро́шее rule" states that after a sibilant consonant, neuter adjectives end in -ее.
 The masculine accusative singular and the accusative plural endings depend on animacy, as with nouns.
 The instrumental feminine ending -ой/-ей has old-fashion alternative form -ою/-ею for all adjectives, which has only a stylistic difference.
 There are often stress changes in the short form. For example, the short forms of но́вый ("new") are нов (m.), но́во (n.), нова́ (f.), новы́/но́вы (pl.).
 In the masculine singular short form, when a word-final consonant cluster is being formed after ending removal, an additional е or о interfix is inserted after the root, as in го́лоден, from голо́дный ("hungry").
 Some adjectives (e.g. большо́й "big", ру́сский "Russian") have no short forms.

Comparison of adjectives 
Comparison forms are usual only for qualitative adjectives and adverbs. Comparative and superlative synthetic forms are not part of the paradigm of original adjective but are different lexical items, since not all qualitative adjectives have them. A few adjectives have irregular forms that are declined as usual adjectives: большо́й 'big' – бо́льший 'bigger', хоро́ший 'good' – лу́чший 'better'. Most synthetically-derived comparative forms are derived by adding the suffix -е́е or -е́й to the adjective stem: кра́сный 'red' – красне́е 'more red'; these forms are difficult to distinguish from adverbs, whose comparative forms often coincide with those of their adjectival counterparts. Superlative synthetic forms are derived by adding the suffix -е́йш- or -а́йш- and additionally sometimes the prefix наи-, or using a special comparative form with the prefix наи-: до́брый 'kind' – добре́йший 'the kindest', большо́й 'big' – наибо́льший 'the biggest'.

An alternative is to add an adverb to the positive form of the adjective. The adverbs used for this are бо́лее 'more' / ме́нее 'less' and са́мый 'most' / наибо́лее 'most' / наиме́нее 'least': for example, до́брый 'kind' – бо́лее до́брый 'kinder' – са́мый до́брый 'the kindest'. This way is rarely used if special comparative forms exist.

Possessive adjectives 
Possessive adjectives are less frequently used in Russian than in most other Slavic languages, but are in use. They respond to the questions чей? чья? чьё? чьи? (whose?) and denote only animate possessors. See section below.

Pronouns

Personal pronouns 

 Russian is subject to the T–V distinction. The respectful form of the singular you is the same as the plural form. It begins with a capital letter: Вы, Вас, Вам, etc., in the following situations: personal letters and official papers (addressee is definite), and questionnaires (addressee is indefinite); otherwise it begins with minuscule. Compare the distinction between du and Sie in German or tu and vous in French.
 When a preposition is used directly before a third-person pronoun, it is prefixed with н-: у него (read: у нево), с неё, etc. Because the prepositional case always occurs after a preposition, the third person prepositional always starts with an н-.
 There are special cases for prepositions before first person singular pronouns: со мной – "with me" (usually с), ко мне – "to me" (usually к), во мне – "in me" (usually в), обо мне – "about me" (usually о). All of these preposition forms are unstressed.
 Like adjectives and numerals, letter "г" (g) in masculine and neuter 3rd person genitive and accusative forms is pronounced as "в" (v): (н)его – (н)ево.
 English "it" can be translated as both оно́ (neuter personal pronoun) and э́то (neuter proximal demonstrative, "this"). The latter is used as a stub pronoun for a subject: э́то хорошо́ – "it/this is good", кто́ это? – "who is it/this?".

Demonstrative pronouns 

If the preposition "about" is used (usually о), for singular demonstrative pronouns (as with any other words starting with a vowel) it is об: об э́том – about this.

Possessive adjectives and pronouns 
Unlike English, Russian uses the same form for a possessive adjective and the corresponding possessive pronoun. In Russian grammar they are called possessive pronouns притяжательные местоимения (compare with possessive adjectives like Peter's = Петин above). The following rules apply:
 Possessive pronouns agree with the noun of the possessed in case, gender, and number.
 The reflexive pronoun свой is used when the possessor is the subject of the clause, whatever the person, gender, and number of that subject.
 No non-reflexive exists for the third person: the genitive of the personal pronoun is instead, i.e. его for a masculine/neuter singular possessor, её for a feminine singular possessor and их for a plural possessor. But unlike other genitives used with a possessive meaning, in modern Russian these words are usually placed before the object of possession.
 Example of the difference between reflexive and non-reflexive pronouns:
 "Он лю́бит свою́ жену́ = He loves his (own) wife"   while   "Он лю́бит его́ жену́ = He loves his (someone else's) wife".
 Unlike Latin where a similar rule applies for the third person only, Russian accepts using reflexives for all persons:
 "Люблю́ (свою́) жену́ = (I) love my wife"
 "Люблю́ себя́ = (I) love myself"

The ending -его is pronounced as -ево́.

Interrogative pronouns 

These interrogatives are used by scholars to denote "usual" questions for correspondent grammatical cases (prepositional is used with о): (кто?) Ма́ша лю́бит (кого?) Ва́сю – (who?) Masha [N.] loves (whom?) Vasya [G.].

The ending "-его" is pronounced as "-ево".

Numerals 

Russian has several classes of numerals ([имена] числительные): cardinal, ordinal, collective, and also fractional constructions; also it has other types of words, relative to numbers: collective adverbial forms (вдвоём), multiplicative (двойной) and counting-system (двоичный) adjectives, some numeric-pronominal and indefinite quantity words (сколько, много, несколько). Here are the numerals from 0 to 10:

Verbs 
Grammatical conjugation is subject to three persons in two numbers and two simple tenses (present/future and past), with periphrastic forms for the future and subjunctive, as well as imperative forms and present/past participles, distinguished by adjectival and adverbial usage (see adjectival participle and adverbial participle). Verbs and participles can be reflexive, i.e. have reflexive suffix -ся/-сь appended after ending.

The past tense is made to agree in gender with the subject, for it is the participle in an originally periphrastic perfect formed (like the perfect passive tense in Latin) with the present tense of the verb "to be" быть , which is now omitted except for rare archaic effect, usually in set phrases (откуда есть пошла земля русская , "whence is come the Russian land", the opening of the Primary Chronicle in modern spelling). The participle nature of past-tense forms is exposed also in that they often have an extra suffix vowel, which is absent in present/future; the same vowel appears in infinitive form, which is considered by few scholars not to be verbal (and in the past it surely used to be a noun), but in which verbs appear in most dictionaries: ходить "to walk" – ходил "(he) walked" – хожу "I walk".

Verbal inflection is considerably simpler than in Old Russian. The ancient aorist, imperfect, and (periphrastic) pluperfect have been lost, though the aorist sporadically occurs in secular literature as late as the second half of the eighteenth century, and survives as an odd form in direct narration (а он пойди да скажи , etc., exactly equivalent to the English colloquial "so he goes and says"), recategorized as a usage of the imperative. The loss of three of the former six tenses has been offset by the development, as in other Slavic languages, of verbal aspect. Most verbs come in pairs, one with imperfective or continuous, the other with perfective or completed aspect, usually formed with a (prepositional) prefix, but occasionally using a different root. E.g., спать  ('to sleep') is imperfective; поспать  ('to take a nap') is perfective.

The present tense of the verb быть is today normally used only in the third-person singular form, есть, which is often used for all the persons and numbers. As late as the nineteenth century, the full conjugation, which today is extremely archaic, was somewhat more natural: forms occur in the Synodal Bible, in Dostoevsky and in the bylinas (былины ) or oral folk-epics, which were transcribed at that time. The paradigm shows as well as anything else the Indo-European affinity of Russian:

Infinitive 
The infinitive is the basic form of a verb for most purposes of study. In Russian it has the suffix -ть/-ти (the latter is used after consonants), or ends with -чь (but -чь is not a suffix of a verb). For reflexive verbs -ся/-сь suffix is added in the end.

Present-future tense 
Future tense has two forms: simple and compound. 
Future simple forms are formed by the perfective verbs with the help of personal endings: "She will read" (She will have read) — "Она прочита́ет"; "She will read" (She will read [for a certain amount of time]) — "Она почита́ет". 
Future compound forms are formed by the imperfective verbs: future simple tense form of the verb "быть" (to be) and the infinitive of the imperfective verb. The Russian compound future tense is remarkably similar in structure to the English simple future tense: "She will read" (She will be reading) — "Она бу́дет чита́ть".

 -у/-ут,-ат is used after a hard consonant or ж, ш, щ or ч; otherwise -ю/-ют,-ят is used.
 A mutating final consonant may entail a change in the ending.
 е becomes ё when stressed.
Two forms are used to conjugate the present tense of imperfective verbs and the future tense of perfective verbs.

The first conjugation is used in verb stems ending in:

 a consonant,
 -у,-ы or -о,-я
 -е (In addition to below)
 Бить, пить, жить, шить, лить, вить, гнить, брить, стелить, зиждить.
 -а not preceded by a hush (ж, ш, щ or ч):

The second conjugation involves verb stems ending in:

 -и or -е (Глядеть, смотреть, видеть, ненавидеть, обидеть, зависеть, терпеть, вертеть, пыхтеть, сидеть, лететь, гудеть, гореть, сопеть, дудеть, блестеть, храпеть, смердеть, хрипеть, шелестеть, хрустеть, сипеть, кишеть, бдеть, звенеть, кряхтеть, кипеть, корпеть, зудеть, скорбеть, тарахтеть, шуметь, зреть, висеть, греметь, шипеть)
 -а preceded by a hush (ж, ш, щ or ч)(Слышать, дышать, держать, лежать, дребезжать, жужжать, брюзжать, дрожать, бренчать, стучать, мычать, кричать, молчать, рычать, мчать, урчать, звучать, бурчать, ворчать, торчать, журчать, гнать):
 Стоять, бояться
Example: попро-с-ить – попро-ш-у, попро-с-ят  (to have solicited – [I, they] will have solicited).

Examples 

There are five irregular verbs:
 бежа́ть (run), бре́зжить (glimmer) – first conjugation in the plural third person, second in other forms;
 хоте́ть (want) – first conjugation in the singular, second in plural;
 дать (give) – дам, дашь, даст, дади́м, дади́те, даду́т;
 есть (eat) – ем, ешь, ест, еди́м, еди́те, едя́т.

Past tense 
The Russian past tense is gender specific: –л for masculine singular subjects, –ла for feminine singular subjects, –ло for neuter singular subjects, and –ли for plural subjects. This gender specificity applies to all persons; thus, to say "I slept", a male speaker would say я спал, while a female speaker would say я спалá.

Examples

Exceptions

Moods 
Russian verbs can form three moods (наклонения): indicative (изъявительное), conditional (сослагательное) and imperative (повелительное).

Imperative mood 
The imperative mood second-person singular is formed from the future-present base of most verbs by adding -и (stressed ending in present-future, or if base ends on more than one consonant), -ь (unstressed ending, base on one consonant) or -й (unstressed ending, base on vowel). Plural (including polite на вы) second-person form is made by adding -те to singular one: говорю 'I speak' – говори – говорите, забуду 'I shall forget' – забудь – забудьте, клею 'I glue' – клей – клейте. Some perfective verbs have first-person plural imperative form with -те added to similar simple future or present tense form: пойдёмте 'let us go'. Other forms can express command in Russian; for third person, for example, пусть particle with future can be used: Пусть они замолчат! 'Let them shut up!'.

Conditional mood 

The conditional mood in Russian is formed by adding the particle бы after the word which marks the supposed subject into a sentence formed like in the past tense. Thus, to say "I would (hypothetically) sleep" or "I would like to sleep", a male speaker would say я спал бы (or я бы поспа́л), while a female speaker would say я спалá бы (or я бы поспала́).

Verbs of motion 
Verbs of motion are a distinct class of verbs found in several Slavic languages. Due to the extensive semantic information they contain, Russian verbs of motion pose difficulties for non-native learners at all levels of study. Unprefixed verbs of motion, which are all imperfective, divide into pairs based on the direction of the movement (uni- or multidirectional — sometimes referred to as determinate/indeterminate or definite/indefinite). As opposed to a verb-framed language, in which path is encoded in the verb, but manner of motion typically is expressed with complements, Russian is a satellite language, meaning that these concepts are encoded in both the root of the verb and the particles associated with it, satellites. Thus, the roots of motion verbs convey the lexical information of manner of movement, e.g. walking, crawling, running, whereas prefixes denote path, e.g. motion in and out of space. The roots also distinguish between means of conveyance, e.g. by transport or by one's own power, and in transitive verbs, the object or person being transported. The information below provides an outline of the formation and basic usage of unprefixed and prefixed verbs of motion.

Unprefixed

Directionality 
Unidirectional verbs describe motion in progress in one direction, e.g.:
 We are headed to the library.Мы идём в библиотеку.
 I was on my way to work.Я шла на работу.
 The birds are flying south.Птицы летят на юг.
Multidirectional verbs describe:
 General motion, referring to ability or habitual motion, without reference to direction or destination, e.g.:
 The child has been walking for six months.Ребёнок ходит шесть месяцев.
 Birds fly, fish swim, and dogs walk.Птицы летают, рыбы плавают, а собаки ходят.
 Movement in various directions, e.g.:
 We walked around the city all day.Мы ходили по городу весь день.
 Repetition of completed trips, e.g.:
 She goes to the supermarket every week.Она ходит в супермаркет каждую неделю.
 In the past tense, a single completed round trip, e.g.:
 I went to Russia (and returned) last year.В прошлом году я ездил в Россию.

Unidirectional perfectives with по- 
The addition of the prefix по- to a unidirectional verb of motion makes the verb perfective, denoting the beginning of a movement, i.e. 'setting out'. These perfectives imply that the agent has not yet returned at the moment of speech, e.g.,

Going versus taking 
Three pairs of motion verbs generally refer to 'taking', 'leading' with additional lexical information on manner of motion and object of transport encoded in the verb stem. These are нести/носить, вести/водить, and везти/возить. See below for the specific information on manner and object of transport:

Prefixed motion verbs  
Motion verbs combine with prefixes to form new aspectual pairs, which lose the distinction of directionality, but gain spatial or temporal meanings. The unidirectional verb serves as the base for the perfective, and the multidirectional as the base for the imperfective. In addition to the meanings conveyed by the prefix and the simplex motion verb, prepositional phrases also contribute to the expression of path in Russian. Thus, it is important to consider the whole verb phrase when examining verbs of motion.

In some verbs of motion, adding a prefix requires a different stem shape:

See below for a table the prefixes, their primary meanings, and the prepositions that accompany them, adapted from Muravyova. Several examples are taken directly or modified from Muravyova.

Idiomatic uses 
The uni- and multidirectional distinction rarely figures into the metaphorical and idiomatic use of motion verbs, because such phrases typically call for one or the other verb. See below for examples:

Adjectival participle 
Russian adjectival participles can be active or passive; have perfective or imperfective aspect; imperfective participles can have present or past tense, while perfective ones in classical language can be only past. As adjectives, they are declined by case, number and gender. If adjectival participles are derived from reciprocal verbs, they have suffix -ся appended after the adjectival ending; this suffix in participles never takes the short form. Participles are often difficult to distinguish from deverbal adjectives (this is important for some cases of orthography).

Active present participle 
Лю́ди, живу́щие в э́том го́роде, о́чень до́брые и отве́тственные – The people living in this city are very kind and responsible.

In order to form the active present participle, the "т" of the 3rd person plural of the present tense is replaced by "щ" and add a necessary adjective ending:

Note: Only imperfective verbs can have an active present participle.

(*) Note: These forms are obsolete in modern Russian and they are not used in the spoken language as forms of the verb 'to be'.

Reflexive verbs paradigm 

The participle agrees in gender, case and number with the word it refers to:
Я посвяща́ю э́ту пе́сню лю́дям, живу́щим в на́шем го́роде – I dedicate this song to the people living in our city.
Я горжу́сь людьми́, живу́щими в на́шем го́роде – I'm proud of the people living in our city.

Active past participle 

The active past participle is used in order to indicate actions that happened in the past:
Де́вушка, чита́вшая тут кни́гу, забы́ла свой телефо́н – The girl, that read this book here, forgot her phone (the girl read the book in the past).

Compare:
Де́вушка, чита́ющая тут кни́гу, – моя́ сестра́ – The girl reading this book here is my sister (she is reading the book now, in the present).

In order to form the active past participle the infinitive ending '-ть' is replaced by the suffix '-вш-' and add an adjective ending:

Reflexive verbs paradigm

Passive present participle 

обсужда́ть – to discuss;
обсужда́емый (full form), обсужда́ем (short form) – being discussed or able to be discussed;

In order to form the passive present participle it is necessary to add an adjective ending to the 1st person plural of the present tense:

Passive participles are occasional in modern Russian. Often, same meaning is conveyed by reflexive active present participles:

рису́ющийся (self-drawing) instead of рису́емый (being drawn, drawable);
мо́ющийся (self-washing) instead of мо́емый (being washed);

The forms ending in -омый are mostly obsolete. Only the forms ведо́мый (from вести́ – to lead) and иско́мый (from иска́ть – to search, to look for) are used in the spoken language as adjectives:

ведо́мый челове́к – a slave (driven, following) man;
иско́мая величина́ – the sought quantity.

Passive past participle 
сде́лать – to do/to make (perfective verb)
сде́ланный – done/made

Passive past participles are formed by means of the suffixes '-нн-' or '-т-' from the infinitive stem of perfective verbs. Besides that, this kind of participle can have short forms formed by means of the suffixes '-н-' or '-т-':

Adverbial participle 
Adverbial participles (деепричастия) express an earlier or simultaneous action providing context for the sentence in which they occur, similar to the English constructions "having done X" or "while doing Y".

Like normal adverbs, adverbial participles are not declined. They inherit the aspect of their verb; imperfective ones are usually present, while perfective ones can only be past (since they denote action performed by the subject, the tense corresponds to the time of action denoted by the verb). Almost all Russian adverbial participles are active, but passive constructions may be formed using adverbial participle forms of the verb быть (past бывши "having been", present будучи "being"); these may be combined with either an adjectival participle in the instrumental case (Будучи раненным, боец оставался в строю – Being wounded, the combatant remained in the row), or a short adjective in the nominative (Бывши один раз наказан, он больше так не делал – Having been punished once, he didn't do it any more).

Present adverbial participles are formed by adding the suffix -а/-я (or sometimes -учи/-ючи, which is usually deprecated) to the stem of the present tense. A few past adverbial participles (mainly of intransitive verbs of motion) are formed in the same way, but most are formed with the suffix -в (alternative form -вши, always used before -сь), some whose stem ends with a consonant, with -ши. For reflexive verbs, the suffix -сь remains at the very end of the word; in poetry it can take the form -ся.

In standard Russian, adverbial participles are considered a feature of bookish speech; in colloquial language they are usually replaced with single adjectival participles or constructions with verbs: Пообедав, я пошёл гулять ("Having eaten, I went for a walk") → Я пообедал и пошёл гулять ("I had dinner and went for a walk"). But in some dated dialects adverbial and adjectival participles may be used to produce perfect forms which sound illiterate and do not occur in modern Russian; e.g. "I haven't eaten today" will be "Я сегодня не евши" instead of "Я сегодня не ел".

Irregular verbs 

1These verbs all have a stem change.
2These verbs are palatalised in certain cases, namely с → ш for all the present forms of "писа́ть", and д → ж in the first person singular of the other verbs.
3These verbs do not conform to either the first or second conjugations.

Word formation 

Russian has on hand a set of prefixes, prepositional and adverbial in nature, as well as diminutive, augmentative, and frequentative suffixes and infixes. All of these can be stacked one upon the other to produce multiple derivatives of a given word. Participles and other inflectional forms may also have a special connotation. For example:

Russian has also proven friendly to agglutinative compounds. As an extreme case:

Purists (as Dmitry Ushakov in the preface to his dictionary) frown on such words. But here is the name of a street in St. Petersburg:

Some linguists have suggested that Russian agglutination stems from Church Slavonic. In the twentieth century, abbreviated components appeared in the compound:

Syntax 
Basic word order, both in conversation and written language, is subject–verb–object. However, because grammatical relationships are marked by inflection, considerable latitude in word order is allowed, and all possible permutations can be used. For example, the words in the phrase "я пошёл в магазин" ('I went to the shop') can be arranged:
 Я пошёл в магазин. (I went to the shop; I went to the shop.)
 Я в магазин пошёл. (I to the shop went; approx. I am going out, my destination is the shop.)
 Пошёл я в магазин. (Went I to the shop; two meanings: can be treated as a beginning of a narrated story: "Went I to the shop, and something happened." or a decision made by someone after a long contemplation: "OK, I think I will go the shop.")
 Пошёл в магазин я. (Went to the shop I; rarely used, can be treated as a beginning of a line of a poem written in amphibrach due to uncommon word order, or when the speaker wants to highlight that exactly this subject "went to the shop". In that case, the subject is stressed)
 В магазин я пошёл. (To the shop I went; two meanings: can be used as a response: "I went to the shop." – "Sorry, where did you go?" – "To the shop—that's where I went." or an emphasis on the way of transportation: I went to the shop on foot.)
 В магазин пошёл я. (To the shop went I; It was me who went to the shop.)
while maintaining grammatical correctness. Note, however, that the order of the phrase "в магазин" ("to the shop") is kept constant.

Word order can express logical stress, and degree of definiteness. The primary emphasis tends to be initial, with a weaker emphasis at the end. Some of these arrangements can describe present actions, not only past (despite the fact that the verb пошёл is in the past).

In some cases, alternative word order can change the meaning entirely:
 Не надо меня уговаривать. ("No need me [to] persuade" → One should not persuade me [as I would never agree to do something].)
 Меня не надо уговаривать. ("Me no need [to] persuade" → There is no need to persuade me [as I will do it anyway].)

Impersonal sentences 
Russian is a null-subject language – it allows constructing sentences without subject. Some of them are claimed to  not be impersonal, but to have oblique subject. One possible classification of such sentences distinguishes:
 Subjectless impersonals contain an impersonal verb (in form of single third-person or single neutral), and no other word is used as a subjectСмеркалось. '(It got) dusky.'
 В Москве полночь. '(It's) midnight in Moscow.'
 Dative impersonals usually express personal feelings, where experiencer in dative case can possibly be considered as subjectМне скучно. 'I'm bored.'
 Other impersonals have an element which is neither nominative nor dative, but still is a nominal verb argumentМеня тошнит. 'I feel sick.'
 Васю ударило током. 'Vasya had an electric shock.'

Negation

Multiple Negatives 
Unlike in standard English, multiple negatives are compulsory in Russian, as in "никто никогда никому ничего не прощает"  ('No-one ever forgives anyone for anything' literally, "no one never to no-one nothing does not forgive"). Usually, only one word in a sentence has negative particle or prefix "не" or belongs to negative word "нет", while another word has negation-affirmative particle or prefix "ни"; but this word can often be omitted, and thus ни becomes the signal of negation: вокруг никого нет and вокруг никого both mean "there is nobody around".

Adverbial answers 
As a one-word answer to an affirmative sentence, yes translates да and no translates нет, as shown by the table below. 

No simple rule supplies an adverbial answer to a negative sentence. B. Comrie says that in Russian answer да or нет is determined not so much by the negative form of the question as by the questioner's intent for using negation, or whether the response is in agreement with his presupposition. In many cases that means that the adverbial answer should be extended for avoiding ambiguity; in spoken language, intonation in saying нет can also be significant to if it is affirmation of negation or negation of negation.

Note that while expressing an affirmation of negation by extending "да" with a negated verb is grammatically acceptable. In practice it is more common to answer "нет" and subsequently extend with a negated verb paralleling the usage in English. Answering a negative sentence with a non-extended "нет" is usually interpreted as an affirmation of negation again in a way similar to English.

Alternatively, both positive and negative simple questions can be answered by repeating the predicate with or without не, especially if да/нет is ambiguous: in the latest example, "сержусь" or "не сержусь".

Coordination 
The most common types of coordination expressed by compound sentences in Russian are conjoining, oppositional, and separative. Additionally, the Russian grammar considers comparative, complemental, and clarifying. Other flavors of meaning may also be distinguished.

Conjoining coordinations are formed with the help of the conjunctions и "and", ни … ни ("not … not" — simultaneous negation), та́кже "also", то́же ("too"; the latter two have complementary flavors), etc. Most commonly the conjoining coordination expresses enumeration, simultaneity or immediate sequence. They may also have a cause-effect flavor.

Oppositional coordinations are formed with the help of the oppositional conjunctions: а "and"~"but", но "but", одна́ко "however", зато́ "on the other hand", же "and"~"but", etc. They express the semantic relations of opposition, comparison, incompatibility, restriction, or compensation.

Separative coordinations are formed with the help of the separative conjunctions: и́ли "or", ли́бо "either", ли … ли "whether … or", то … то "then … then", etc. They express alternation or incompatibility of things expressed in the coordinated sentences.

Complemental and clarifying coordination expresses additional, but not subordinated, information related to the first sentence.

Comparative coordination is a semantic flavor of the oppositional one.

Common coordinating conjunctions include:
 и  "and", enumerative, complemental;
 а  "and", comparative, tending to "but" or "while";
 но  "but", oppositional.

The distinction between "и" and "а" is important:
"и" implies a following complemental state that does not oppose the antecedent;
"а" implies a following state that acts in opposition to the antecedent, but more weakly than "но" ("but").

The distinction between "и" and "а" developed after medieval times. Originally, "и" and "а" were closer in meaning. The unpunctuated ending of the Song of Igor illustrates the potential confusion. The final five words in modern spelling, "князьям слава а дружине аминь"  can be understood either as "Glory to the princes and to their retinue! Amen." or "Glory to the princes, and amen (R.I.P.) to their retinue". Although the majority opinion is definitely with the first interpretation, no consensus has formed. The psychological difference between the two is quite obvious.

Subordination 
Complementizers (subordinating conjunctions, adverbs, or adverbial phrases) include:
 если  'if' (meaning 'in case where' not meaning 'whether');
 потому что  'because'
 так как  'since' (meaning 'for the reason that')
 чтобы , дабы  (bookish, archaic) 'so that'
 после того, как  'after'
 хотя  'although'

In general, Russian has fewer subordinate clauses than English, because the participles and adverbial participles often take the place of a relative pronoun/verb combination. For example:

Absolute construction 
Despite the inflectional nature of Russian, there is no equivalent in modern Russian to the English nominative absolute or the Latin ablative absolute construction. The old language had an absolute construction, with the noun in the dative. Like so many other archaisms, it is retained in Church Slavonic. Among the last known examples in literary Russian occurs in Radishchev's Journey from Petersburg to Moscow (Путешествие из Петербурга в Москву ), 1790:
 Едущу мне из Едрова, Анюта из мысли моей не выходила.  "As I was leaving Yedrovo village, I could not stop thinking about Aniuta."

See also 
 List of Russian language topics
 Reduplication in the Russian language

Notes

References

External links 
 Interactive On-line Reference Grammar of Russian
 Wikibooks Russian
 Concise one-page tabular grammar reference
 Gramota.ru – dictionaries
 Wiktionary has word entries in Cyrillic with meanings and grammatical analysis in English
 Russian Wiktionary gives word meanings and grammatical analysis in Russian
 Russian grammar overview with practice tests
 Over 400 links to Russian Grammar articles around the Net (wayback machine)
 Free online Russian grammar book (with videos)